Vũ Minh Tuấn (born 19 September 1990) is a Vietnamese footballer who plays for V.League 1 club Hà Nội

He was called to Vietnam national under-23 football team to attend 2013 SEA Games. He was also called to Vietnam national football team at the friendly matches against Myanmar.

Career player 
Born and raised in Cam Pha and father was a member of the Than Quang Ninh. Vu Minh Tuan has been playing for many years for the youth teams of Quang Ninh.
In 2008, at the age of 18, Tuan was named to the first team of the Than Quang Ninh to participate in the national first division that year. In 2012, he was one of the contributors to Quang Ninh U21 winning the bronze medal at the U21. U21 Football Championship and is a member of the U21 Vietnam won the second place in the Youth International U21 Youth League. Also in 2012 he was also voted as the 2012 Moolock Enthusiast.

Vu Minh Tuan continued to play impressive club colors when scoring five goals. List of players to score in the league and the Quang Ninh Coal ranked second in the first division, winning a place in the National League, [1] Level of the football club of Vietnam. Also in this year, Vu Minh Tuan was called up to the  Vietnam U23 to attend the SEA Games 27 in Myanmar. Although not successful team team but he also made two times in the tournament.

Vu Minh Tuan was named in the list of the Vietnam national football team in 2014 for the final match of the Asian Cup 2015 with the Hong Kong team. Vu Minh Tuan and his Vietnamese Olympic team made a seismic shock when they won the Iranian 4-1 Olympics (at Asiad 17 Icheon Korea 2014).

Also in the year 2014 Vu Minh Tuan and his teammates competed very successfully in the Vietnam Olympic shirt at the Asiad 17 when he and his teammates topped Group H with the match that caused the earthquake

He is also in the squad for Vietnam AFF Suzuki Cup team in late 2014, is a factor in the team of coach Toshiya Miura] and is considered the "new wind" of the team. Vietnam. However, he and his teammates had to stop in the semifinals when they lost to Malaysia [2-4] on the National Stadium.

At the 2014 Golden Ball award, Toshiya Miura was selected by the national head coach Toshiya Miura as the Golden Ball. Although it did not achieve the title (Golden Cup Winners) but this has confirmed the ability of Vu Minh Tuan in the Vietnam team.

International career

International goals

Honours
Than Quảng Ninh
Vietnamese National Cup: 2016
Vietnamese Super Cup: 2017
Viettel
V.League 1: 2020
Hà Nội
V.League 1: 2022 
Vietnamese National Cup: 2022
Vietnam 
AYA Bank Cup: 2016

External links

References 

1990 births
Living people
People from Quảng Ninh province
Vietnamese footballers
V.League 1 players
Association football midfielders
Vietnam international footballers
Than Quang Ninh FC players
Footballers at the 2014 Asian Games
Asian Games competitors for Vietnam